This is a list of celebrities who have appeared on the cover of Maxim magazine.

1997

1998

1999

2000

2001

2002

2003

2004

2005

2006

2007

2008

2009

2010

2011

2012

2013

2014

2015

2016

2017

2018

2019

2020

2021

2022

Notes

References

External links
 Cover archive of Maxim USA

Maxim
Maxim